Uintacrinus ("crinoid from the Uinta Mountains") is an extinct genus of crinoids from the Cretaceous of Kansas. It was unusual among crinoids because it had no stalk, and probably floated above the seafloor. It lived in the Western Interior Seaway. This crinoid was a colonial animal with ten long arms each that it used to capture prey.

Footnotes

Sources
 Fossils (Smithsonian Handbooks) by David Ward (Page 174)
 "Notes on Uintacrinus socialis Grinnell" http://www.oceansofkansas.com/Uintacrinus.html

References
 Everhart, Mike "Notes on Uintacrinus socialis Grinnell" http://www.oceansofkansas.com/Uintacrinus.html
 

Uintacrinida
Prehistoric crinoid genera
Cretaceous animals of North America
Prehistoric echinoderms of North America